In number theory, Vieta jumping, also known as root flipping, is a proof technique. It is most often used for problems in which a relation between two integers is given, along with a statement to prove about its solutions. In particular, it can be used to produce new solutions of a Diophantine equation from known ones. There exist multiple variations of Vieta jumping, all of which involve the common theme of infinite descent by finding new solutions to an equation using Vieta's formulas.

History 
Vieta jumping is a classical method in the theory of quadratic Diophantine equations and binary quadratic forms. For example, it was used in the analysis of Markov equation back in 1879 and in the 1953 paper of Mills.

In 1988, the method came to the attention to mathematical olympiad problems in the light of the first olympiad problem to use it in a solution that was proposed for the International Mathematics Olympiad and assumed to be the most difficult problem on the contest:

Let  and  be positive integers such that  divides . Show that  is the square of an integer.

Arthur Engel wrote the following about the problem's difficulty:

Among the eleven students receiving the maximum score for solving this problem were Ngô Bảo Châu, Ravi Vakil, Zvezdelina Stankova, and Nicușor Dan. Emanouil Atanassov (from Bulgaria) solved the problem in a paragraph and received a special prize.

Standard Vieta jumping
The concept of standard Vieta jumping is a proof by contradiction, and consists of the following four steps:
 Assume toward a contradiction that some solution exists that violates the given requirements.
 Take the minimal such solution according to some definition of minimality.
 Using Vieta's formulas, show that this implies the existence of a smaller solution, hence a contradiction.

 Example
Problem #6 at IMO 1988: Let  and  be positive integers such that  divides . Prove that  is a perfect square.
 Fix some value  that is a non-square positive integer.
 Fixing , replace  with the variable  to yield .
The first expression for  shows that  is an integer, while the second expression implies that  since  is not a perfect square. From  it further follows that , and hence  is a positive integer.

Constant descent Vieta jumping
Unlike standard Vieta jumping, constant descent is not a proof by contradiction, and it consists of the following four steps:
 The equality case is proven so that it may be assumed that .
The other root,  is determined using Vieta's formulas.
 Prove the statement for the base case, and as  has remained constant through this process, this is sufficient to prove the statement for all ordered pairs.

 Example
Let  and  be positive integers such that  divides .  Prove that .
So, without loss of generality, assume that . 
 For any  satisfying the given condition, let  and rearrange and substitute to get .
 The first equation shows that  is an integer and the second that it is positive.
 The base case we arrive at is the case where .  For  to satisfy the given condition,  must divide , which implies that  divides 2, making  either 1 or 2. The first case is eliminated because .  In the second case, .  As  has remained constant throughout this process of Vieta jumping, this is sufficient to show that for any  satisfying the given condition,  will always equal 3.

Geometric interpretation
Vieta jumping can be described in terms of lattice points on hyperbolas in the first quadrant. The same process of finding smaller roots is used instead to find lower lattice points on a hyperbola while remaining in the first quadrant. The procedure is as follows:
 From the given condition we obtain the equation of a family of hyperbolas that are unchanged by switching  and  so that they are symmetric about the line .
 Prove the desired statement for the intersections of the hyperbolas and the line .
 Assume there is some lattice point  on some hyperbola and without loss of generality . Then by Vieta's formulas, there is a corresponding lattice point with the same -coordinate on the other branch of the hyperbola, and by reflection through  a new point on the original branch of the hyperbola is obtained.
 It is shown that this process produces lower points on the same branch and can be repeated until some condition (such as ) is achieved. Then by substitution of this condition into the equation of the hyperbola, the desired conclusion will be proven.

 Example 
This method can be applied to problem #6 at IMO 1988: Let  and  be positive integers such that  divides .  Prove that  is a perfect square.
If ,   is a perfect square as desired. If , then   and there is no integral solution  .
This proposition's statement is then true for the point  . 
Let . Since , it follows that . Hence the point  is in the first quadrant.
 The process in the previous step can be repeated whenever the point  has a positive -coordinate.

See also
 Vieta's formulas
 Proof by contradiction
 Infinite descent
 Markov number
 Apollonian gasket

Notes

External links
 Vieta Root Jumping at Brilliant.org
 

Number theory
Diophantine equations